Jackie French Koller (born 1948) is an American author of picture books, chapter books, and novels for children and young adults. She lives and writes in western Massachusetts.

Koller is also an accomplished painter. Her interest in art inspired her to open The Little Black Dog Gallery in Westfield, Massachusetts.

Koller's young-adult novel If I Had One Wish was adapted into a Disney Channel Original Movie under the title You Wish!.

Selected works
 Baby for Sale (Marshall Cavendish, 2002): .
 The Falcon
 If I Had One Wish
 Last Voyage of the Misty Day
 No Such Thing (Boyds Mills Press, 2012): . 
 One Monkey Too Many
 A Place to Call Home
 The Primrose Way
 Someday
 Nothing to Fear

References

External links
 
 Interview With Children's and YA Author Jackie French Koller

American children's writers
American women novelists
People from Hampden County, Massachusetts
Living people
1948 births
20th-century American novelists
American young adult novelists
American women children's writers
20th-century American women writers
Women writers of young adult literature
Women science fiction and fantasy writers
21st-century American women